United Nations Security Council resolution 2560 was adopted on December 29, 2020. It was the last Security Council resolution of the year.

The resolution, adopted unanimously, encouraged the member countries to operate more actively in respect to the enforcement of sanctions on individuals and groups related to the Islamic State of Iraq and the Levant and Al-Qaeda. The Security Council urged the countries to interact more proficuously with the committee dedicated to the overseeing of the enforcement of sanctions against this terrorist groups located in Iraq, Syria, Libya, and Somalia.

Additionally, the resolution pushed for the submission to the committee of lists and data regarding individuals, groups, undertakings and entities that could meet the criteria established by resolution 2368, in order to maintain the material about the ISIS and Al-Qaeda sanctions record reliable and up to date. It also recommended the establishment of a team for the monitorization of sanctions, to study the exemption procedures laid out in resolution 2368, and to draft an advice to the committee on whether an exemptions update is required.

See also 
 List of United Nations Security Council Resolutions 2501 to 2600 (2019–2021)

References

External links 

 Text of the Resolution at undocs.org

United Nations Security Council resolutions concerning terrorism
December 2020 events
 2560